Mark Gronowski is an American football quarterback for the South Dakota State Jackrabbits.

Early life and high school
Gronowski grew up in Naperville, Illinois and attended Neuqua Valley High School. As a senior, he completed 132 of 194 pass attempts for 1,663 yards with 15 touchdowns and one interception while also rushing for 846 yards and 12 touchdowns. Gronowski committed to play college football at South Dakota State, which was his only Division I scholarship offer, over offers from Butler and Valparaiso, which play in the non-scholarship Pioneer Football League, and from Division II Quincy and Bemidji State.

College career
Gronowski's freshman season at South Dakota State (SDSU) was postponed from the fall to the spring of 2021 due to COVID-19. He was named the Jackrabbits starting quarterback going into his freshman season. Gronowski passed for 1,584 yards and 15 touchdowns and also rushed for 577 yards and seven touchdowns.  He was named the Missouri Valley Football Conference (MVFC) Offensive Player of the Year, as well as the conference Freshman and Newcomer of the Year, at the end of the season. South Dakota State advanced to the 2021 NCAA Division I Football Championship Game, but Gronowski suffered a serious knee injury on the first offensive drive of the game and the team lost 23-21 to Sam Houston State. He used a medical redshirt for the 2021 fall season to recover from his injury.

Gronowski returned as SDSU's starting quarterback at the beginning of the 2022 season. He was named second-team All-MVFC as the Jackrabbits returned to the FCS National Championship Game. Gronowski was named the games Most Valuable Player after completing 14 of 21 pass attempts for 223 yards and three touchdowns and rushing for 57 yards and
one touchdown in a 45-21 victory over North Dakota State. He finished the season with 2,967 passing yards and 26 touchdowns with five interceptions and also rushed for 408 yards and 12 touchdowns.

Statistics

References

External links
South Dakota State Jackrabbits bio

Living people
Players of American football from Illinois
American football quarterbacks
South Dakota State Jackrabbits football players
Sportspeople from Naperville, Illinois
Year of birth missing (living people)